Corvera is the name of a number of places in Spain:
 Corvera de Asturias, a concejo in Asturias 
 Corvera de Toranzo, a municipio (municipality) in Cantabria
 Corvera (Cantabria), a city in that municipio
 Corvera (Murcia), a pedanía (autonomous region) in the municipio of Murcia